Flow Motion is the seventh studio album by German rock band Can. It was released in October 1976 and features the UK hit single "I Want More".

Recording and production
Recording sessions for what would become Flow Motion began at Can's Inner Space Studio in Cologne in the spring of 1976. Since their previous album Landed, the band had been recording on a state-of-the-art 16-track machine, which had changed the dynamics of the group and the way they recorded. Instead of playing everything live together, different members could now record their parts separately. This, and their embracing of rhythms (especially disco) on Flow Motion that were unpopular with rock music fans, is probably why the album was not as well received by fans and critics when it first appeared.

Flow Motion was mixed using "Artificial Head" binaural stereo.

The cover features a photograph taken by band member Michael Karoli.

Music
Throughout their career, Can had always experimented with a number of different rhythms. With Flow Motion, the band became more playful, adding disco and reggae to this list. Apart from the new rhythms, the influence of recording with 16 tracks meant there are multiple guitar lines from Michael Karoli, and Irmin Schmidt's keyboards also come to the fore, providing much of the shimmering and shiny atmosphere that is found throughout the album.

A disco vibe dominates the opening track "I Want More", which is short, catchy and danceable. The song was released as a single and became a hit, reaching number 26 in the UK Singles Chart in August 1976. The band even appeared on Top of the Pops to perform the song.

Reggae infuses most of the rest of the album, although Can experiments with rhythm and instrumentation, rather than playing it straight. This is exemplified on "Cascade Waltz", which combines a reggae beat with a waltz, and on "Laugh Till You Cry, Live Till You Die", which features guitarist Karoli playing the Turkic bağlama.

After the reprise of the opening track "...And More", which finished side one of the original vinyl album, side two opens with "Babylonian Pearl", which is evocative of "Come Sta, La Luna" on Soon Over Babaluma. The song's vocals are handled by Irmin Schmidt, and speak about a girl who "comes from a land where woman is man". This, and all of the other lyrics on this album, were written by Peter Gilmour, the band's live sound engineer.

The next song, the gloomy-sounding "Smoke (E.F.S. Nr. 59)", is more experimental, with Jaki Liebezeit's intense ethnic tom-tom beat driving the song forward.

Another experimental track, the lengthy and unrestrained "Flow Motion", closes the album.

Reception and influence
The more accessible nature of Flow Motion, and its flirtation with disco, meant this album was not well received at the time of its release. Many took affront to seeing the band playing disco, lip-synching and dancing to Top of the Pops, especially as rock fans generally hated disco in the 1970s.

Many fans felt that Can had abandoned its experimentation and innovation, with artists such as Brian Eno and David Bowie, being influenced by and taking krautrock into a new era. To put this in perspective, Bowie's Station to Station was released the same year as Flow Motion.

Flow Motion, however, has subsequently been re-assessed, with Magnet Magazine labelling it a "hidden gem" in 2012.

Track listing

Personnel
Can
Holger Czukay – bass, djin on "Smoke", backing vocals on "I Want More", "…And More" and "Smoke"
Michael Karoli – guitars, slide guitar, electric violin on "Cascade Waltz", bağlama on "Laugh Until You Cry", background noise on "Smoke", lead vocals on "Cascade Waltz" and "Laugh Until You Cry", backing vocals on "I Want More", "…And More" and "Flow Motion"
Jaki Liebezeit – drums, percussion, backing vocals on "I Want More", "…And More"
Irmin Schmidt – keyboard, Alpha 77, lead vocals on "Babylonian Pearl" and "I Want More" and "…And More"

Produced by Can. "Cascade Waltz" was produced by Can and Simon Puxley.

The album was recorded at Inner Space Studio, Weilerswist, near Cologne by Holger Czukay and René Tinner and was mixed by Manfred Schunke at Delta Acoustic Studio, Wilster, Germany.

References

1976 albums
Can (band) albums
Virgin Records albums
Binaural recordings